Sperm Bluff is a prominent dark bluff, 3 nautical miles (6 km) long and over 1,000 m high, forming the northeast extremity of Clare Range, in Victoria Land. Charted and named by the British Antarctic Expedition, 1910–1913. When viewed from the east, the north face of the bluff suggests the blunt head of a sperm whale.

Cliffs of Victoria Land
Scott Coast